Giorgio Demetrio Gallaro (born 16 January 1948) is an Italian prelate of the Catholic Church who was appointed secretary of the Congregation for the Oriental Churches and given the rank of archbishop on 25 February 2020. He was the Bishop of the Eparchy of Piana degli Albanesi, a diocese of the Italo-Albanian Catholic Church in Sicily, Italy from 2015 to 2020, where he remains Apostolic Administrator.

Biography
Gallaro was born in Pozzallo, Sicily, on 16 January 1948. He began his studies in preparation for the priesthood in the seminary of Noto, he moved to Los Angeles where he studied at St. John's Seminary and was ordained a priest in 1972. He then worked for eight years as a parish priest in two parishes of the Eastern Rite in Los Angeles. He then studied in Rome at the Pontifical Oriental Institute of Rome and at the Pontifical University of Saint Thomas Aquinas, obtaining his doctorate in canonical eastern law and a licenciate in ecumenical theology.

He then carried out parish and teaching activities in the Melkite Greek Catholic Eparchy of Newton, Newton, Massachusetts, including as in-house instructor of canon law to the Melkite seminarians residing at St. Gregory's seminary in Newton Centre, MA.  He was also active in the Ukrainian Eparchy of Stamford, Connecticut, and in the Ruthenian Archeparchy of Pittsburgh, Pennsylvania. Beginning in 2011 he was Vice-President of the Society of Oriental Law. In 2013 he was named a consultor to the Congregation for the Oriental Churches. He continued to hold several other positions, including sincello for canonical affairs and judicial vicar in the Archeparchy of Pittsburgh, professor of canon law and ecumenical theology at the Byzantine Catholic Seminary of Saints Cyril and Methodius of Pittsburgh, and judge of appeal for the Philadelphia Archeparchy of the Ukrainians.

On 31 March 2015 he was named by Pope Francis to the bishopric of the Eparchy of Piana degli Albanesi. He was consecrated a bishop on 28 June by the bishop of Lungro Donato Oliverio as principal consecrator, and the bishops Dimitrios Salachas and Nicholas James Samra as co-consecrators.

On 25 February 2020, Pope Francis appointed him secretary of the Congregation for the Oriental Churches and gave him the personal title of archbishop.  He held that post until Pope Francis appointed Michel Jalakh as secretary.

References

External links 
Eparchy's Bishop page 
Byzantine Catholic Seminary of SS. Cyril and Methodius website
 

21st-century Italian Roman Catholic archbishops
St. John's Seminary (California)
Italian people of Arbëreshë descent
1948 births
Living people
People from Pozzallo
Bishops of Piana degli Albanesi
Officials of the Roman Curia